Joris van Soerland (born 15 October 1972) is a retired Dutch male badminton player. He competed at the 1996 Summer Olympic Games in Atlanta, United States.

References

External links
 
 SR/Olympic Sports

1972 births
Living people
Dutch male badminton players
Badminton players at the 1996 Summer Olympics
Olympic badminton players of the Netherlands
People from Nuenen, Gerwen en Nederwetten
Sportspeople from North Brabant